Dennis Earl Stolz (born September 12, 1934) is a former American football player and coach.  He served as the head coach at Alma College (1965–1970), Michigan State University (1973–1975), Bowling Green State University (1977–1985), and San Diego State University (1986–1988), compiling a career college football record of 125–93–2.

Stolz graduated from Alma College in 1955.

Stolz served as defensive coordinator and linebacker coach at Michigan State for two seasons before being promoted to succeed Duffy Daugherty as head coach on December 12, 1972. He was selected over Johnny Majors, Lee Corso and Barry Switzer who had removed himself from consideration the previous day. Stolz's three years as Spartans head coach was marred by a player recruiting scandal that culminated with the National Collegiate Athletic Association (NCAA) placing the program on three years’ probation on January 25, 1976. As a result, the Spartans were prohibited from any television and bowl game appearances through the 1978 season. Stolz resigned at the behest of university president Clifton R. Wharton Jr. and the board of trustees just over seven weeks later on March 16, 1976.

Head coaching record

References

1934 births
Living people
Alma Scots football coaches
Alma Scots football players
Michigan State Spartans football coaches
Bowling Green Falcons football coaches
San Diego State Aztecs football coaches
High school football coaches in Michigan